Albert J. Ellis Airport  is a county-owned public-use airport in Onslow County, North Carolina, United States. It is located in Richlands, 10 nautical miles (19 km) northwest of the central business district of Jacksonville and Marine Corps Base Camp Lejeune. The airport has a single runway and three gates. Opening on February 15, 1971, the airport is used by general aviation, the military and two commercial airlines, American Eagle and Delta Connection.

American Eagle operates services to Charlotte. These services are operated by PSA Airlines, which operates CRJ-700s and CRJ-900s, and Piedmont Airlines, which operates ERJ-145s.

On August 30, 2006, Delta Air Lines announced new service from the airport to Atlanta, Georgia, operated by Delta Connection carrier ExpressJet Airlines, starting on December 11, 2006. Delta began operating B-717 aircraft on the OAJ-ATL route on August 28, 2016. When ExpressJet closed, the service transferred to Endeavor Airlines.

Facilities and aircraft

For the 12-month period ending May 31, 2020, the airport had 29,544 aircraft operations, an average of 81 per day: 35% military, 33% general aviation, 23% scheduled commercial and 9% air taxi. In December 2020, there were 26 aircraft based at this airport: 22 single-engine, 1 multi-engine and 3 helicopter.

The airport is served by a fixed-base operator, Skyport Aviation, which offers fueling, maintenance, flight instruction and aircraft rentals from the new 10,000-ft2 executive terminal, which opened in 2015.

In 2013, the airport began construction on a two-story,  replacement passenger terminal building. The new terminal features passenger loading bridges, new concessions, expanded passenger areas and space for additional airlines. This is part of the airport's $50-million Terminal Area Redevelopment Program.  The new terminal was topped off on June 10, 2014, and officially opened on August 19, 2015, National Aviation Day.

On December 6, 2017, the airport began construction on its first air traffic control tower. The six-story-tall tower opened on November 1, 2018.

The airport upgraded the lighting and signs on the runway and taxiways to LED in 2018/2019. A project to add a  extension to the northeast end of the runway (lengthening the runway to  total) is planned to begin in 2023, with construction beginning in 2025. Other projects to rehabilitate and expand airfield pavements are also planned to begin between 2023 and 2027.

Passenger statistics

Top nonstop destinations

Airlines and destinations

References

External links

 at NCDOT airport directory
Aerial image as of March 1993 from USGS The National Map

Airports in North Carolina
Buildings and structures in Onslow County, North Carolina
Transportation in Onslow County, North Carolina